The Eisner Award for Best Reality-Based Work is an award for "creative achievement" in non-fiction American comic books.

Winners and nominees

Notes

References

Category
2006 establishments in the United States
Annual events in the United States
Awards established in 2006
Reality-Based Work